Reskadinnick is a hamlet north of Camborne in west Cornwall, England, UK The postal code for Reskadinnick, Cornwall is TR14 OBL.

Stephen MacKenna
Stephen MacKenna was a journalist, linguist and writer of Irish descent. He is perhaps most well known for his important English translation of the Greek-speaking philosopher Plotinus. He was resident at Reskadinnick in his latter years.

References

Hamlets in Cornwall